Barrow is an old lunar impact crater that is located near the northern limb of the Moon. It lies between the crater Goldschmidt to the northwest and the irregular formation Meton to the northeast. To the southwest is W. Bond.

The outer wall of Barrow has been heavily eroded by subsequent impacts, and reshaped by intruding craters. As a result, the rim now resembles a ring of rounded hills and peaks surrounding the flat interior. The younger satellite crater Barrow A lies across the southwest rim. At the eastern end of the crater is a narrow gap in the rim that joins the floor to the adjacent crater Meton. The rim achieves its maximum height and extend in the northwest, where it is joined to Goldschmidt.

The interior of Barrow has been resurfaced by lava flows, leaving a flat surface that is marked by many tiny craterlets. Faint traces of ray material from Anaxagoras to the west forms streaks across the floor of Barrow.

Satellite craters
By convention these features are identified on lunar maps by placing the letter on the side of the crater midpoint that is closest to Barrow.

References

 
 
 
 
 
 
 
 
 
 
 
 

Impact craters on the Moon